Dinosaurs: Myths & Reality is a 1995 British television documentary, hosted by Fred Applegate and directed by Graham Holloway; aimed at families, it tests viewers knowledge about dinosaurs, utilizing graphics, paintings, museum replicas, moving models, clips from movies, dinosaur fossils and interpretations by paleontologists Michael Brett-Surman and David Norman.

References

External links

Documentary films about dinosaurs
British television documentaries
1995 television films
1995 films
1995 documentary films
1990s English-language films
1990s British films